Carl Beverly "Bev" Bledsoe (October 6, 1923 – June 5, 2012) was an American politician in the state of Colorado, representing the Eastern Plains counties of Colorado in the state House of Representatives. He served as Speaker of the Colorado House of Representatives from 1981 to 1991, making the longest tenured speaker ever in the state's history.

Bledsoe was born in Aroya, Colorado, to Carl and Josie Bledsoe. After attending public schools and the University of Colorado, he served in World War II, attaining the rank of sergeant. Upon his return, he studied for a Bachelor of Science degree in animal husbandry from Colorado State University and began ranching near Hugo.

Prior to his election to the Colorado House of Representatives in 1973, Bledsoe sat on and chaired many county political, school, and veterinarian committees. He served nine consecutive terms in the house and led the legislative audit and finance committees. He retired in 1991. He died at his home in Hugo in 2012 at the age of 88.

References

1923 births
2012 deaths
Republican Party members of the Colorado House of Representatives
Ranchers from Colorado
People from Cheyenne County, Colorado
People from Lincoln County, Colorado
Speakers of the Colorado House of Representatives
American military personnel of World War II
American non-commissioned personnel